The Union Pacific Intermodal Bridge is a rail crossing of the Kansas River in Kansas City, Missouri.
It was built in 1911, as a four span thru-truss on the UPRR railroad.
It has a screw jack lift system to allow it to be raised to avoid flood waters.
It gets its "Intermodal" part of its name because it connects to the Union Pacific Intermodal yard about 500 feet to the west.

It is the sister bridge to the Missouri Pacific Bridge

Bridges over the Kansas River
Railroad bridges in Missouri
Bridges completed in 1911
Bridges in Kansas City, Missouri
Intermodal
1911 establishments in Missouri
Truss bridges in the United States
Vertical lift bridges in Missouri